João Paulo de Oliveira (born 13 June 1985 in Rio de Janeiro, Brazil) is a Brazilian footballer currently playing for Novorizontino.

He has played for Brasil de Pelotas, Madureira, Glória, Juventude in Brazil, Germinal and Bornem in the Belgian second division as well.

Honours 
 Olhanense
 Liga de Honra: 2008-09

 Grêmio Novorizontino
 Campeonato Paulista Série A2: 2015

 Novo Hamburgo
 Campeonato Gaúcho: 2017

External links

Living people
1985 births
Footballers from Rio de Janeiro (city)
Brazilian footballers
Brazilian expatriate footballers
Association football forwards
Expatriate footballers in Portugal
Brazilian expatriate sportspeople in Portugal
Expatriate footballers in Belgium
Campeonato Brasileiro Série A players
Campeonato Brasileiro Série B players
Campeonato Brasileiro Série C players
Campeonato Brasileiro Série D players
Belgian Pro League players
Primeira Liga players
Grêmio Esportivo Brasil players
Madureira Esporte Clube players
Beerschot A.C. players
Esporte Clube Juventude players
Grêmio Esportivo Glória players
C.F. Os Belenenses players
S.C. Olhanense players
Veranópolis Esporte Clube Recreativo e Cultural players
Esporte Clube Pelotas players
Clube Atlético Linense players
Associação Chapecoense de Futebol players
Guaratinguetá Futebol players
Esporte Clube Passo Fundo players
Clube Atlético Penapolense players
Grêmio Novorizontino players
Esporte Clube Novo Hamburgo players
Sociedade Esportiva e Recreativa Caxias do Sul players